Elahieh (also spelt Elahiyeh) is an affluent and upper-class district in northern Tehran. The area is a residential and commercial locale and is filled with the homes and businesses of many politicians, diplomats, expatriates, and artists.

It is home to Tehran's most expensive real estate, averaging at $1,442 per square feet comparable to Beverly Hills, California. It is also home to the clubhouses of the Russia, Turkey, Germany, Denmark, Switzerland, Belgium, Iceland, Cuba and Finland embassies.

The most famous part of the district is Fereshteh Street, which has been the most expensive street in Tehran. This is where the newest buildings and many fashionable locales, including top-end shops and chichi cafes, can be found. Fereshteh used to be one of the most quiet, peaceful and greenest part of northern Tehran with vast gardens but has seen significant development and real estate investment after the Islamic revolution, especially during a construction boom in the 1990s, when Gholamhossein Karbaschi and Ghalibaaf served as mayor of Tehran. During this boom, many of the huge gardens and large houses were replaced with the most fashionable high rises which has increased the population of this area significantly.  This has caused problems for narrow alleys around this area; the traffic often gets gridlocked on summer nights. 

In the book The Ayatollah Begs to Differ, Hooman Majd says that Elahieh is one of Tehran's "most fashionable districts" in Tehran, since this area included big gardens and mansions with eye catching architecture designs. It was perhaps the greenest part of northern Tehran as it was receiving most of mountain waters. The highest part of Elahieh had the most beautiful and scenic garden view in northern Tehran.

About 

Elahiyeh is an upper class district in Northern Tehran, actually a part of Shemiran.  Before Shemiran was officially incorporated into the city of Tehran, the area consisted of expensive residences and gardens used as summer homes for wealthy residents of Tehran.  Today however residential towers and upscale penthouses have replaced them for good and few of those gardens have actually escaped development.

Persian classical musician  Esmaiel Mehrtash was living in Koohyar street in Fereshteh Avenue. Esmail Mehrtash, a tar player and musician, established Jame'eh Barbod in 1926, where operettas such as "Leili & Majnoun", "Khosrow & Shirin" as well as "Khayyam" went on stage.

Mahmoud Hessaby (1903–1992) a prominent Iranian scientist, researcher and distinguished professor of University of Tehran also lived in Elahieh on Hessaby Street. He was the receiver of the medal of the commandeur de la Légion d'honneur, France's highest scientific medal in 1957 for his achievements, including his classic paper on "Continuous particles" and his model of "Infinitely extended particles".

The house of the former military leader and Cabinet Minister of Iran during Reza Shah Lieutenant General Ahmad Amir-Ahmadi (1884–1974) (now a museum) is in Elahieh on Hessabi Street, and is the newly opened Iranian Art Garden Museum, which is home to some replicas of Iran's best known historical monuments, an art gallery, and a nice outdoor cafe. Sepahbod Ahmad Amir-Ahmadi was the first Iranian lieutenant General in Iran. He was appointed as the minister of interior (1942) and minister of war (1948) during Reza Shah dynasty.  He was also appointed a senator to the first senate and held it for sixteen years.

Most of the land in this district once belonged to Fakhr ol dowleh, a daughter of Mozaffareddin Shah Qajar, known to be the richest woman in Iran during her life.

See also 
 Zafaraniyeh
 Fereshteh Pasargad Hotel
 Iranian Art Museum Garden

References

Neighbourhoods in Tehran